Carol A. Schrader (born 1951) is an Omaha, Nebraska native and former news anchor who worked at KETV from 1977 to 1996.

Education and early career
Schrader was initially a radio reporter in the 1970s after attending the University of Nebraska-Omaha where she was elected homecoming queen. She was editor of the student newspaper and a student of Omaha media legend, Joe McCartney, who was also public relations director of the Union Pacific Railroad. She eventually returned to UNO in the late 1980s to complete her bachelor's degree in journalism.

KETV
Schrader was one of the first female news anchors on Omaha television. Her career at KETV was noted for a weekly community affairs interview show called Viewpoint as well as a weekly feature known as Wednesday's Child which tried to assist children who were up for adoption.  Ms. Schrader and her former husband, retired Omaha Fire Chief Joe Napravnik, adopted one of the interviewed children themselves.

Schrader left KETV in a dispute with management just after the 5pm newscast on October 1, 1996.

After KETV
After leaving KETV, Schrader worked in talk radio as the first female news director for KFAB before revamping her television career through a weekly interview show called Consider This at PBS station KYNE. In 2006, Schrader retired from her television career to take a job as Chief Deputy with the Democratic-controlled Douglas County Assessor's office.  She then moved on to become a real estate agent in 2007. Schrader has been a regular performer in the Omaha Press Club shows as well as other stage endeavors. She has also hosted numerous community events over the years.

Awards and recognition
Schrader was added to the Omaha Press Club Journalists of Excellence Hall of Fame in 2013 and the UNO Women's Walk Chair in 2000.

References

1951 births
Living people
People from Omaha, Nebraska
American women journalists
University of Nebraska Omaha alumni
21st-century American women